The moustached turca (Pteroptochos megapodius) is a passerine bird which is endemic to Chile. It belongs to the tapaculo group and is a member of the genus Pteroptochos, along with the two species of Huet-huet.

Description
It is a stocky bird, 23–24 cm long, with a heavy bill and strong legs and feet. The tail is often held cocked. The plumage is mostly brown with white barring on the breast, belly and undertail-coverts. The bird has a dark eyestripe, white eyebrow and a broad white moustachial stripe. The bill and legs are black. The northern race atacamae is smaller and paler with less obvious barring on the underparts.

Behaviour and ecology
The song is a series of low, hooting notes lasting for 5 to 10 seconds. Birds often call while perched on top of a rock.
The nest is built at the end of a tunnel up to two metres long which is dug in an earth bank or roadside cutting. Two or three white eggs are laid.

Distribution and habitat
The nominate subspecies is found in central Chile from northern Bío-Bío Region north to Coquimbo Region. The isolated form atacamae occurs in Atacama Region. Both inhabit arid slopes with rocks and shrubbery from sea level to high in the foothills of the Andes, reaching 3700 metres in the north. It is a mainly ground-dwelling bird which can run quickly. It feeds on invertebrates such as insects and worms.

References

Jaramillo, Alvaro; Burke, Peter & Beadle, David (2003) Field Guide to the Birds of Chile. Christopher Helm, London.
Aves de Chile: Moustached Turca

moustached turca
Birds of Chile
Endemic birds of Chile
moustached turca
Taxa named by Heinrich von Kittlitz